The Texas Tenors are a three-time Emmy Award-winning classical crossover, trio vocal group formed in 2009 by country singer JC Fisher,  classical singer Marcus Collins and opera singer John Hagen. They were a top four finalist in the fourth season of America's Got Talent, making them the highest ranking vocal group in the show's history.

In 2013, The trio filmed their first PBS special with The Phoenix Symphony, performing songs from their second album You Should Dream.  Along with being one of only two acts from America's Got Talent (The Texas Tenors and Jackie Evancho) to star in their own television special for PBS, The Texas Tenors achieved another milestone in 2014 when they were honored with five Emmy Awards nominations and three wins for the self-produced special. The group also supports many charitable organizations.

The group has performed more than 1300 concerts in over 20 countries including Great Britain and China. In August 2017 The Texas Tenors premiered their second PBS special and on September 8, 2017, released their third studio album of the same name, Rise, which debuted at #1 on the Billboard Classical Albums Chart, #1 Heatseeker New Artist Chart and #22 Top Current Albums resulting in the group's highest charting positions and most successful sales week ever.

In 2018, the trio released A Collection of Broadway & American Classics exclusively at their live concerts and through their website at the request of their fan club.  Without distribution or a national campaign, the album debuted at #1 on the Billboard Classical Albums Chart and spent 10 weeks in the top 10.

Career

America's Got Talent (2009)
The trio auditioned for America's Got Talent season four, performing a crossover version of "Mountain Music". They advanced week after week, finishing in fourth place.

Performances/Results

After America's Got Talent
The group's self-titled debut album, The Texas Tenors, was released in 2009. The album contained all four songs that were performed on America's Got Talent, some arias such as "Nessun dorma" and "La donna è mobile" as well as other songs. In 2011, the group remastered the album and included some new material. The album has sold 225,000 units to date.

Their second studio album, You Should Dream, was released on December 10, 2013. Produced by Academy Award and Grammy nominated producer Nigel Wright, You Should Dream features "God Bless the USA", "Unchained Melody", The Rolling Stones' "Wild Horses", two original songs and a 65 piece orchestra.

The Texas Tenors are one of only two acts from America's Got Talent to star in their own television special for PBS, the group achieved a milestone in 2014 when they were honored with five Emmy Awards nominations and three wins.

In 2017, The Texas Tenors' third studio album Rise debuted at #1 on the Classical Albums Chart and #5 on the Top Country Albums Chart resulting in the most successful week of sales for the group and their highest charting positions to date.

America's Got Talent: The Champions (2019)
In 2019, The Texas Tenors competed on America's Got Talent: The Champions. Their performance consisted of singing "Unchained Melody" as a trio and in the end, was acclaimed by the judges and the audience.

Discography

Studio albums

Live albums

Singles

Video: Filmed Concerts and Events

References

External links

America's Got Talent contestants
Country music groups from Texas
American pop music groups
Musical groups established in 2009
Tenor vocal groups